Parliamentary elections were held in Guinea on 22 March 2020 alongside a constitutional referendum, after being postponed four times from the original date of January 2019.

Electoral system
The 114 members of the National Assembly are elected by a mixed member system; 38 are elected from single-member constituencies based on the 33 prefectures and five communes of Conakry by first-past-the-post voting, whilst the other 76 are elected from a single nationwide constituency by proportional representation.

Results
The elections were boycotted by the main opposition parties. As a result, President Condé's party won a supermajority of seats.

References

Guinea
2020 in Guinea
Elections in Guinea
March 2020 events in Africa